The Lyceum of the Principality of Serbia was the first higher education school in Serbia in which education was taught in Serbian.

History
The Lyceum of the Principality of Serbia  was founded in 1838 on the initiative of Prince Miloš Obrenović in Kragujevac, then the capital of Serbia. When Belgrade became the Serbian capital city in 1841, the Serbian Lyceum was also transferred. In 1863 it was transformed into a Great School with three faculties. In 1905 the Great School was reformed as the University of Belgrade with four faculties: Philosophy, Law, Technical and Medical. 

Initially, the Lyceum had only philosophy and law departments. In 1845 the Lyceum received the first instruments from future physics professor and rector of the Lycée Vuk Marinković. A natural science and engineering department was added to the philosophy and law department, in 1853 and included a Chemistry department which is considered as nucleus of the Faculty of Chemistry at Belgrade University. The laboratory of the chemistry department was in the basement of the Princess Ljubica's Residence.

Students 
There were 21 students in the first generation and 17 of them finished the studies. In the first period, there were only between 20 and 30 students in each generation. After graduation, some of them received the government's scholarship to continue their education abroad. 

The Lycée was intended to provide the kind of pragmatic education needed for civil servants in the growing administration: in 1815 there were just 24 government officials, but this number grew to 672 by 1839.

The first student organization in Serbia, Association of Serbian Youth, was established in this lyceum in 1847, but it was soon banned because of their criticism of the Defenders of the Constitution.

Professors 
The first six professors of the Lyceum were Jovan Sterija Popović, Đura Daničić, Josif Pančić, Matija Ban, Dimitrije Nešić and Konstantin Branković.

References 

Educational institutions established in 1838
Principality of Serbia
1838 establishments in Serbia
Lyceum of the Principality of Serbia